A memorial society may refer to:

Memorial (society), an international historical and civil rights organization in a number of post-USSR states
Funeral Consumers Alliance, a consumer organization of memorial societies

See also